Ilmarë, or Varda I, full designation , is the single known natural satellite of the Kuiper Belt planetoid 174567 Varda. It was discovered by Keith Noll et al. in 2009, at a separation of about 0.12 arcsec, using discovery images taken by the Hubble Space Telescope on 26 April 2009, and reported in 2011. At approximately 326 km in diameter (about 45% that of its primary), it is the fourth or fifth-largest known moon of a trans-Neptunian object, after Pluto I Charon, Eris I Dysnomia, Orcus I Vanth and very possibly Haumea I Hiʻiaka.

Name 
Names for Varda and its moon were announced on 2014 January 16. Ilmarë is a chief of the Maiar and handmaiden to Varda, the queen of the Valar, creator of the stars, and principal goddess of the elves in J. R. R. Tolkien's fictional mythology.

Characteristics 
Ilmarë and Varda are tightly bound, with a separation of about 13 Varda radii, and a consequently low angular momentum. Along with the high inclination of Varda's orbit, they are similar in this way to the Orcus–Vanth and Salacia–Actaea systems. As of 2015 two mirror orbital solutions are possible with slightly different orbital parameters. The calculated eccentricity is inconsistent with the likely age of the system, suggesting that it might be spurious, but the expected age is also contradicted by suggestions that Varda may not be tidally locked.

If Ilmarë and Varda have the same albedo, Ilmarë would be  in radius, or approximately 8.4% the volume of Varda.
If Ilmarë has a 50%-greater albedo, then its radius would be  and the bulk density would be . Because the absolute magnitudes of the two bodies at different wavelengths are similar, it's not likely that their albedos differ by much, so Ilmarë is likely to be in this size range.

Notes

References
 

Trans-Neptunian satellites
174567 Varda
Astronomical objects discovered in 2009
Things named after Tolkien works